The 1931 Southern Illinois Maroons football team was an American football team that represented Southern Illinois Normal University (now known as Southern Illinois University Carbondale) in the Illinois Intercollegiate Athletic Conference (IIAC) during the 1931 college football season.  In its 15th season under head coach William McAndrew, the team compiled a 7–2 record.

Schedule

References

Southern Illinois
Southern Illinois Salukis football seasons
Southern Illinois Maroons football